Soncini is a surname. Notable people with the surname include:

Eugenio Soncini (1906–1993), Italian architect
Giovanni Soncini, 16th-century Italian painter
Giuseppe Soncini (1926–1991), Italian politician
Guia Soncini (born 1972), Italian journalist, columnist, and writer